Dörte Stüdemann (born 14 February 1964) is a German former volleyball player. She competed in the women's tournament at the 1988 Summer Olympics.

References

External links
 

1964 births
Living people
German women's volleyball players
Olympic volleyball players of East Germany
Volleyball players at the 1988 Summer Olympics
People from Güstrow
Sportspeople from Mecklenburg-Western Pomerania